The canton of Le Sud-Est agenais is an administrative division of the Lot-et-Garonne department, southwestern France. It was created at the French canton reorganisation which came into effect in March 2015. Its seat is in Layrac.

It consists of the following communes:
 
Astaffort
Castelculier
Caudecoste
Clermont-Soubiran
Cuq
Fals
Grayssas
Lafox
Layrac
Puymirol
Saint-Caprais-de-Lerm
Saint-Jean-de-Thurac
Saint-Nicolas-de-la-Balerme
Saint-Pierre-de-Clairac
Saint-Romain-le-Noble
Saint-Sixte
Saint-Urcisse
Sauvagnas
Sauveterre-Saint-Denis

References

Cantons of Lot-et-Garonne